Breus is a surname. Notable people with the surname include: 

Carl Breus (1852–1914), Austrian obstetrician
Pyotr Breus (1927–2000), Russian water polo player
Serhiy Breus (born 1983), Ukrainian swimmer
Yevheniia Breus, Ukrainian wheelchair fencer

See also
Reus (surname)